Grabowo  is a village in Kolno County, Podlaskie Voivodeship, in north-eastern Poland. It is the seat of the gmina (administrative district) called Gmina Grabowo.

The village has a population of 800.

References

Grabowo
Łomża Governorate
Białystok Voivodeship (1919–1939)
Belastok Region